Snowbound: The Record of a Theatrical Touring Party (1908) is a collection of short stories by Bram Stoker, the author of Dracula. Set in rural Scotland, where a party of travelling actors are trapped in the snow telling stories to each other to pass the time, the book is influenced by Stoker's years in the service of Sir Henry Irving.

The stories in this collection are:

The Occasion
A Lesson in Pets
Coggins's Property
The Slim Syrens
A New Departure in Art
Mick the Devil
Barksdales Lies
In Fear of Death
At Last
Chin Music
A Deputy Waiter
Work'us
A Corner in Dwarfs
A Criminal Star
A Star Trap
A Moon-Light Effect

References

External links
 Bram Stoker Online Full text and PDF versions of the entire collection.

1908 short story collections
Short story collections by Bram Stoker